The Matlabas River is a river in Limpopo Province, South Africa. It is a tributary of the Limpopo River. The river's catchment area comprises 3,448 square kilometers. The entire catchment area of the river is located within the Waterberg District Municipality.

Course
The Matlabas has its source in the western part of the Waterberg Massif within the area of the Marakele National Park. After leaving the mountains it flows roughly northwestwards across the Lowveld until it joins the right bank of the Limpopo River.

Although it is a perennial river, the Matlabas is highly subject to seasonal variations, thus its runoff is very variable. Its main tributary is the Mamba River.

See also
Drainage basin A
 List of rivers of South Africa

References

External links
Water Resource Quality Situation Assessment
South Africa: Limpopo: Lephalale

Rivers of Limpopo
Tributaries of the Limpopo River